Ritner is a surname. Notable people with the surname include:

Joseph Ritner (1780–1869), American politician
Robert K. Ritner (born 1953), American Egyptologist
R. W. Ritner, a president of Western Tri-State League

See also
Ritter (surname)